The Copa 2014 MX Clausura was the 71st staging of the Copa MX, the 44th staging in the professional era and is the fourth tournament played since the 1996–97 edition.

This tournament started on January 14, 2014 and concluded on April 9, 2014.
 The winner was Tigres, was scheduled face Monarcas Morelia, who won the Apertura 2013 edition, in a home-to-home series on July 9 and 12 to qualify as Mexico 3 to the 2015 Copa Libertadores.

Participants Clausura 2014

This tournament will feature the clubs from the Liga MX who did not participate in the 2013-14 CONCACAF Champions League (Tijuana, Toluca, América and Cruz Azul), and the teams who will participate in the 2014 Copa Libertadores (León, Santos Laguna and Morelia) will not participate as well. The first 13 Ascenso MX teams in the classification phase during the Apertura 2013 season will participate.

Tiebreakers

If two or more clubs are equal on points on completion of the group matches, the following criteria are applied to determine the rankings:

 superior goal difference;
 higher number of goals scored;
 scores of the group matches played among the clubs in question;
 higher number of goals scored away in the group matches played among the clubs in question;
 best position in the Relegation table;
 fair play ranking;
 drawing of lots.

Group stage

Every group is composed by four clubs, two from Liga MX and two from Ascenso MX. Instead of a traditional robin-round schedule, the clubs will play in three two-legged "rounds", the last one being contested by clubs of the same league.

Each win gives a club 3 points, each draw gives 1 point. An extra point is awarded for every round won; a round is won by aggregated score, and if it is a tie, the extra point will be awarded to the team with higher number of goals scored away.

All times are UTC-05:00

Group 1

Monterrey won the round 4−1 on aggregate

Cruz Azul Hidalgo and Pachuca drew 2–2 on aggregate and both tied on away goals, thus neither team received the extra point

Monterrey won the round 6−0 on aggregate

Pachuca won the round 3−2 on aggregate

Teams drew 1−1 on aggregate, Cruz Azul Hidalgo won the round on away goals

Pachuca won the round 5−2 on aggregate

Group 2

UAT won the round 4−2 on aggregate

UANL won the round 7−1 on aggregate

UANL won the round 5−1 on aggregate

Puebla won the round 5−0 on aggregate

San Luis on the round 1−0 on aggregate

UANL won the round 8−0 on aggregate

Group 3

Veracruz won the round 4−0 on aggregate

Oaxaca won the round 5−2 on aggregate

Chiapas won the round 3−2 on aggregate

Oaxaca won the round 1−0 on aggregate

Oaxaca won the round 4−1 on aggregate

Veracruz won the round 5−1 on aggregate

Group 4

Atlante won the round 2−1 on aggregate

UNAM won the round 5−3 on aggregate

Atlante won the round 4−3 on aggregate

UNAM won the round 3−2 on aggregate

Mérida won the round 4−2 on aggregate

Teams drew 2−2 on aggregate and both drew on away goals, thus neither team received the extra point.

Group 5

 In the group matches played by Querétaro and Celaya, Querétaro won 3−2 on aggregate. Article 8 of the Copa MX regulations states if two teams have the same goal differential and the same number of goals scored, the aggregate score of the group matches played among the clubs is the tiebreaker, thus Querétaro won the group.

Necaxa won the round 2−1 on aggregate

Querétaro won the round 3−2 on aggregate

Querétaro won the round 4−2 on aggregate

Celaya won the round 3−2 on aggregate

Teams drew 3−3 on aggregate, Querétaro won on away goals

Celaya won the round 5−2 on aggregate

Group 6

Sinaloa won the round 6−2 on aggregate

Guadalajara won the round 2−1 on aggregate

Estudiantes Tecos won the round 3−2 on aggregate

U. de G. won the round 2−1 on aggregate

Teams drew 2−2 on aggregate, Sinaloa won the round on away goals

Estudiantes Tecos won the round 3−2 on aggregate

Ranking of runners-up clubs

The best two runners-up advance to the Championship Stage. If two or more teams are equal on points on completion of the group matches, the following criteria are applied to determine the rankings:

 superior goal difference;
 higher number of goals scored;
 higher number of goals scored away;
 best position in the Relegation table;
 fair play ranking;
 drawing of lots.

Championship Stage

The eight clubs that advance to this stage will be ranked and seeded 1 to 8. In case of ties, the same tiebreakers used to rank the runners-up will be used.

In this stage, all the rounds will be one-off game. If the game ends in a tie, there will proceed to penalty shootouts directly.

The venue will be determined as follows:

The highest seeded club will host the match, regardless of the division the clubs are in.

Seeding
The qualified teams were seeded 1–8 in the championship stage according to their results in the group stage.

Bracket
The bracket of the championship stage was determined by the seeding as follows:
Quarterfinals: Seed 1 vs. Seed 8 (QF1), Seed 2 vs. Seed 7 (QF2), Seed 3 vs. Seed 6 (QF3), Seed 4 vs. Seed 5 (QF4), with seeds 1–4 hosting the match
Semifinals: Winner QF1 vs. Winner QF4 (SF1), Winner QF2 vs. Winner QF3 (SF2), with winners QF1 and QF2 hosting the match 
Finals: Winner SF1 vs. Winner SF2, with winner SF1 hosting the match

Quarterfinals

Semifinals

Final

Top goalscorers

Source: LigaMX.net

References

External links
 Official page of Copa MX (as well as Liga MX and Ascenso MX)

2014, 1
Copa Mx, 1
Copa Mx, 1
Copa Mx, 2